Synuchus angusticeps is a species of ground beetle in the subfamily Harpalinae. It was described by Tanaka in 1962.

References

Synuchus
Beetles described in 1962